S. laeta may refer to:

 Scolopendra laeta, a tropical centipede
 Senegalia laeta, a perennial legume
 Simianellus laeta, a polyphagan beetle
 Smaragdina laeta, a short-horned leaf beetle
 Smicropus laeta, a geometer moth
 Smidtia laeta, a tachina fly
 Splendrillia laeta, a sea snail
 Strophiona laeta, a lepturine beetle
 Styphelia laeta, a heather endemic to Australia and the Pacific Islands
 Synemon laeta, an Australian moth